Armorial ware or heraldic china (and a variety of other terms) are ceramics decorated with a coat of arms, either that of a family, or an institution or place.  Armorials have been popular on European pottery from the Middle Ages with examples seen on Spanish Hispano-Moresque ware, Italian maiolica, slipware, English and Dutch Delft, and on porcelain from the 18th century. Earlier examples were mostly large pieces such as jugs or basins and ewers, but later whole table services, all painted with the arms, were produced.  

Silver tableware also often had coats of arms engraved on it, but as porcelain replaced metal as the favoured material for elite tableware in the 18th century, armorial porcelain became very popular.  When overglaze decoration was used, the pottery could produce the glazed ware without the arms, which were then added when a commission was received.  

The term is most often associated with Chinese export porcelain, often decorated with the arms and crests of European and American families from the late 17th century through the 19th century.  A painting of the arms was sent out to China, and after a considerable period the painted service arrived.  British clients imported about 4000 services from 1695 until 1820, when a new prohibitive tax stopped the trade, as the British government sought to protect the domestic potteries.

They were, and even more are, often used at table only on special occasions.  They are popular with collectors. Seventeenth-century Dutch armorial plates are called wapenborden and were commonly sold with recurring emblems that cannot be traced to any specific family.

See also

 Goss crested china

References 

Types of pottery decoration
Chinese porcelain